J-Bay Open a.k.a. Billabong Pro Jeffreys Bay is an event on the World Surf League. The event is held every year at Jeffreys Bay in Eastern Cape, South Africa.  Inaugural winner Kelly Slater, and Mick Fanning share the most victories with 4.

Naming
Since the birth of this competition it had different names.

Results

References

 
World Surf League
Surfing competitions in South Africa
Surfing in South Africa
Sport in the Eastern Cape
Recurring sporting events established in 1996